"Shade – Natsu no Kairi" (Japanese: Shade ~夏の翳り~), also known as "Shade", is the fourth single by Kiyotaka Sugiyama, released by VAP on August 26, 1987. The single reached #1 on the Oricon Singles Chart for 1987, giving Sugiyama his second #1 spot since "Mizu no Naka no Answer," released three months prior.

Background 
At the time of the release, it had been three months since the previous single "Mizu no Naka no Answer" was released. Like with "Mizu no Naka no Answer," the single reached the #1 spot on the Oricon charts, and Siguyama was not allowed to be on Tokyo Broadcasting System's program "The Best Ten" due to his contract between VAP and Nippon TV.

Track listing

Charts

Weekly charts

Year-end charts

References 

1987 songs
Oricon Weekly number-one singles
1987 singles
Japanese pop songs